Christoph Kobleder (born March 3, 1990) is an Austrian professional association football player who currently plays for SC Bregenz as a centre back.

References
Christoph Kobleder vor Wechsel zum FC Wacker, laola1.at, 5 January 2016

External links

1990 births
Living people
Austrian footballers
Association football defenders
USK Anif players
LASK players
FC Lustenau players
SC Austria Lustenau players
Wolfsberger AC players
FC Wacker Innsbruck (2002) players
SW Bregenz players
Austrian Football Bundesliga players
2. Liga (Austria) players
People from Hallein
Footballers from Salzburg (state)